Nøst may refer to:

 Arne Nøst (born 1962), Norwegian graphic artist and theatre director
 Nøst Island, Antarctica

See also
 Nost (disambiguation)